Kreviazuk is a surname. Notable people with the surname include:

Alison Kreviazuk (born 1987), Canadian curler
Chantal Kreviazuk (born 1973), Canadian singer, songwriter, composer, pianist, and actress
Cheryl Kreviazuk (born 1992), Canadian curler
Lynn Kreviazuk (born 1991), Canadian curler

Ukrainian-language surnames